Julia Matuschewski (born 15 January 1997) is a Polish footballer who plays as a forward for 1. FC Saarbrücken and has appeared for the Poland women's national team.

Career
Matuschewski has been capped for the Poland national team, appearing for the team during the 2019 FIFA Women's World Cup qualifying cycle.

References

External links
 
 
 

1997 births
Living people
Polish women's footballers
Poland women's international footballers
Women's association football forwards
1. FC Saarbrücken (women) players
1. FFC Frankfurt players
Expatriate women's footballers in Germany
Polish expatriate sportspeople in Germany
Frauen-Bundesliga players
2. Frauen-Bundesliga players